Ramadhar Singh  is an Indian politician with the Bharatiya Janata Party.  A leader of the party in  the state of Bihar, he has been representing the Aurangabad seat in the state assembly winning four out of five elections since 1995.  After winning the recent 
2010 Bihar legislative assembly election with a margin of 7%, he was appointed Cooperative Minister in Nitish Kumar's cabinet.

However, in May 2011, he was forced to resign after it was revealed by the opposition that he had been repeatedly  ignoring court appearance orders related to a communal speech in Aurangabad in 1992.   Though he has 12 cases under the Indian Penal code pending against him in the courts, the opposition has alleged that he had not revealed this case in his election affidavit.  He has secured bail in the remaining 11 cases.

After resigning, Singh claimed that he was ignorant of the court orders and that his lawyers had failed him in the matter.

References 

Bihar MLAs 2010–2015
People from Aurangabad, Bihar
1954 births
Bharatiya Janata Party politicians from Bihar
Living people